Petr Fical (born 23 September 1977) is a Czech-born German former professional ice hockey player.

Fical competed with the Germany men's national ice hockey team at the 2006 Winter Olympics. He also competed with Team Germany at the 2004 World Cup of Hockey, and at the 2005, 2007, and 2008 IIHF World Championships.

Career statistics

Regular season and playoffs

International

References

External links

1977 births
Living people
HC Baník Sokolov players
Czech ice hockey right wingers
ERC Ingolstadt players
Essen Mosquitoes players
HC Karlovy Vary players
Ice hockey players at the 2006 Winter Olympics
Iserlohn Roosters players
Luxembourg national ice hockey team
Nürnberg Ice Tigers players
Olympic ice hockey players of Germany
People from Jindřichův Hradec
EV Regensburg players
Czech emigrants to Germany
Sportspeople from the South Bohemian Region
German ice hockey right wingers
German ice hockey coaches
Czech ice hockey coaches
German expatriate ice hockey people
German expatriate sportspeople in Luxembourg